Brian Wilson (born 14 April 1957) is an English former professional footballer who played in the Football League as a defender or midfielder.

References

External links
 

1957 births
20th-century English people
21st-century English people
Association football defenders
English footballers
English Football League players
Living people
Newcastle United F.C. players
Footballers from Newcastle upon Tyne
Torquay United F.C. players